This is the discography page for ambient electronic group The Future Sound of London.  All works released as The Future Sound of London unless otherwise noted.

Albums

As The Future Sound of London

As Humanoid

 (1989) Global
 (2003) Sessions 84-88 
 (2007) Your Body Sub Atomic
 (2019) Built by Humanoid
 (2021) 7 Songs
 (2022) sT8818r

As Amorphous Androgynous

 (1993) Tales of Ephidrina
 (2002) The Isness (as Amorphous Androgynous, except in the U.S.A.)
 (2003) The Otherness
 (2005) Alice in Ultraland
 (2008) The Peppermint Tree & the Seeds of Superconsciousness 
 (2008) A Monstrous Psychedelic Bubble Exploding in Your Mind: Volume 1 
 (2009) A Monstrous Psychedelic Bubble Exploding in Your Mind: Volume 2 
 (2010) A Monstrous Psychedelic Bubble Exploding in Your Mind: Volume 3
 (2013) The Cartel Vol. 1
 (2013) The Cartel Vol. 2
 (2015) A Monstrous Psychedelic Bubble Exploding in Your Mind: The Wizards of Oz
 (2020) We Persuade Ourselves We Are Immortal (with Peter Hammill)

As Zeebox

 (2007) Zeebox 1984-1987 Vol. 1 
 (2007) Zeebox 1984-1987 Vol. 2 
 (2009) Zeebox 1984-1987 Vol. 3

Other stage names

 (2003) Eurotechno (as Stakker)
 (2007) Hand-Made Devices (as Polemical)
 (2007) 4 Forests (as Part-Sub-Merged)
 (2007) The San Monta Tapes (as Heads Of Agreement)
 (2007) By Any Other Name (as FSOL, Mental Cube, Indo Tribe, Dope Module, Yage and Smart Systems)
 (2008) The Pulse EPs (as FSOL, Indo Tribe, Smart Systems, Yage and Mental Cube)
 (2008) The Woodlands of Old (as Yage)
 (2016) Blackhill Transmitter (as Blackhill Transmitter)
 (2016) Ignition of the Sun (as Synthi A)

Singles and EPs

As The Future Sound of London
 (1991) Papua New Guinea (12")
 (1992) Papua New Guinea (CD)
 (1993) Cascade
 (1994) Expander
 (1994) Lifeforms (feat. Elizabeth Fraser)
 (1995) The Far-Out Son of Lung and the Ramblings of a Madman
 (1996) My Kingdom
 (1997) We Have Explosive
 (2001) Papua New Guinea 2001
 (2002) Papua New Guinea Translations
 (2007) Papua New Guinea (Herd & White Remixes)
 (2007) Archived EP
 (2014) Artworks 1
 (2017) Ramblings Vol. 1
 (2018) Ramblings Vol. 2
 (2018) My Kingdom (Re-Imagined)
 (2019) Ramblings Vol. 3
 (2019) Yage 2019
 (2020) A Controlled Vista 2.7 (MiniPack 1)
 (2020) A Controlled Vista 5.6 (MiniPack 2)
 (2020) Cascade 2020
 (2021) We Have Explosive 2021

As Humanoid
 (1988) Stakker Humanoid
 (1989) Slam
 (1989) Tonight (feat. Sharon Benson)
 (1989) The Deep
 (1989) Crystals
 (1992) Stakker Humanoid '92
 (2001) Stakker Humanoid 2001
 (2007) Stakker Humanoid 2007
 (2018) 30303 EP
 (2020) KAAGE EP
 (2020) Future: Turned EP
 (2020) Orfan Atmosphere EP
 (2021) sT8818r Humanoid

As Mental Cube
 (1990) Q (BZZXL 106033)
 (1991) So This Is Love
 (1991) Q (180 996)

As Amorphous Androgynous
 (1993) Liquid Insects
 (2002) The Mello Hippo Disco Show
 (2003) Divinity
 (2005) The Witchfinder

Other stage names
 (1990) A.S.T. (as Art Science Technology)
 (1990) I Can See for Miles (as Yunie)
 (1991) You Took My Love (as Candese)
 (1991) The Tingler (as Smart Systems)
 (1991) The Pulse EP (as FSOL and Indo Tribe)
 (1991) Pulse 2 EP (as FSOL, Smart Systems and Indo Tribe)
 (1991) Principles of Motion EP (as Intelligent Communication)
 (1991) Pulse 3 EP (as Smart Systems, Indo Tribe and Yage)
 (1992) Fuzzy Logic EP (as Yage)
 (1992) Pulse Four EP (as Mental Cube, Smart Systems and Indo Tribe)
 (1992) People Livin' Today (as Semi-Real)
 (1992) Metropolis (as Metropolis)
 (2008) Tingler 2008 (as Smart Systems)
 (2009) Cloudscraper (as Six Oscillators in Remittance)
 (2013) EP (as Blackhill Transmitter)
 (2013) One (as EMS : Piano)
 (2013) Stillness (as Suburban Domestic)
 (2013) Salient Moons 1972 (as Sand Sound Folly)
 (2013) EP (as Blackhill Transmitter)
 (2014) 2nd (as Blackhill Transmitter)
 (2014) An Open Window (as The Jazz Mags)
 (2015) 3 (as Blackhill Transmitter)
 (2016) Four (as Blackhill Transmitter)
 (2019) MOA016 (as Humanoid / Yage)
 (2020) Pygmy EP (as Yage)

Other
 (1997) ISDN Show (A promo recording of a live netcast)
 (2007) A Gigantic Globular Burst Of Anti-Static (Soundtrack for an art exhibition held at the Kinetica Art Museum, London in 2006)
 (2008) FSOL Digital Mix (A free mix CD with Greek music magazine "Freeze")
 (2012) The Fears and Fantasies of the Unconscious Mind (Sampler previewing tracks released on FSOLDigital)
 (2017) FSOL:Digitana – The SX-One Live Improvisations (Live improvisations promoting the SX-1 synth)

Remix work
They have also garnered a reputation as remixers, transforming the work of a variety of different artists, including:
 (1991) Loleatta Holloway, Do That To Me (Set Me Free)
 (1992) Unity, Unity
 (1992) Inner City, Praise
 (1992) Nomad, Your Love Is Lifting Me
 (1992) Prefab Sprout, "If You Don't Love Me
 (1992) Stereo MCs, Connected
 (1993) Curve, Rising
 (1993) Bryan Ferry, I Put A Spell On You
 (1993) The Shamen, Re:iteration
 (1993) David Sylvian/Robert Fripp, Darshana
 (1994) Apollo 440, Liquid Cool
 (1994) Massive Attack, Sly
 (1995) Jon Anderson, Speed Deep
 (1996) Osamu Sato, Face-Savers On-line
 (2001) Robert Miles, Paths
 (2002) Deadly Avenger, Day One
 (2009) Oasis, Falling Down
 (2009) Neotropic, Home
 (2010) Paul Weller, Aim High/Pieces Of A Dream
 (2010) Pop Levi, Blue Honey
 (2014) Blu Mar Ten, Night Shift

The results are often novel and complex, and in some instances the original track is barely recognisable.

References

Discographies of British artists
House music discographies
Electronic music group discographies